Agrotis charmocrita is a moth of the family Noctuidae. It was first described by Edward Meyrick in 1928. It is endemic to the Hawaiian islands of Kauai and Molokai.

External links

Agrotis
Endemic moths of Hawaii
Biota of Kauai
Biota of Molokai
Moths described in 1928